Pulli Lyon or Lyon Grant, is a developing residential area and suburban area in North Chennai, a metropolitan city in Tamil Nadu, India. Pulli Lyon is well connected with Red Hills which has good transportation.

Location

Pulli Lyon is located in North Chennai with  Red Hills in the west and Puzhal to the South. Other neighbouring areas include Vadagarai, Grant Lyon, Athivakkam. Pulli Lyon is located next to Red Hills and very close to Puzhal aeri.

Surroundings

Neighbourhoods in Chennai